Gerald Anthony Carr (1 February 1936 – 3 November 2019) was a British athlete.

Athletics career
Carr competed in the men's discus throw at the 1956 Summer Olympics. He represented England and won a bronze medal in the discus at the 1958 British Empire and Commonwealth Games in Cardiff, Wales.

References

External links
 

1936 births
2019 deaths
Athletes (track and field) at the 1956 Summer Olympics
British male discus throwers
Olympic athletes of Great Britain
Commonwealth Games medallists in athletics
Commonwealth Games bronze medallists for England
Athletes (track and field) at the 1958 British Empire and Commonwealth Games
Medallists at the 1958 British Empire and Commonwealth Games